Delovoy Tsentr is a station of the Moscow Metro's Kalininsko-Solntsevskaya line that opened on 31 January 2014. The station serves the Moscow International Business Center, after which it was named.

The station served as the terminus of the line until its closure. Services initially ran westward to Park Pobedy, but from 2017, the functioning line extended onward to Ramenki. This station closed on 24 February 2018 and reopened on 12 December 2020. While it weas closed, trains on that line bypassed Delovoy Tsentr and run directly to Shelepikha where it continues along the Bolshaya Koltsevaya line.

The original route of the Solntsevskaya branch of the line through Delovoy Tsentr reflected the fact that the branch does not have an active rail yard. Trains would shift from Delovoy Tsentr to the Arbatsko-Pokrovskaya line and onward to the Izmailovo yard. As the Bolshaya Koltsevaya line uses the Izmailovo yard, trains operate along the new route to Petrovsky Park and onward to the yard.

References 

Moscow Metro stations
Kalininsko-Solntsevskaya line
Railway stations in Russia opened in 2014
Railway stations closed in 2018
Railway stations located underground in Russia